{{Infobox television
| image                = 7.30 - Australian Broadcasting Corporation.png
| caption              = 
| genre                = News Current affairs
| creator              = 
| developer            = 
| writer               = 
| director             = 
| creative_director    = 
| presenter            =  Sarah Ferguson
| starring             = 
| judges               = 
| voices               = 
| narrated             = 
| theme_music_composer = 
| opentheme            = 
| endtheme             = 
| composer             = 
| country              = Australia
| language             = English
| num_seasons          = 13
| num_episodes         = 
| list_episodes        = 
| executive_producer   = Joel Tozer
| producer             = Clay HichensSuzanne DredgeCallum DennessChris Gillett
| cinematography       = 
| editor               = 
| camera               = 
| runtime              = 30 minutes
| company              = 
| picture_format       = 576iHDTV 1080i
| audio_format         = Dolby Digital 5.1
| first_aired          = 
| last_aired           = present
| related              = LatelineMatter of Fact
| network              = Australian Broadcasting Corporation
The program is currently hosted by Sarah Ferguson.

History
The program first aired on 7 March 2011, replacing both The 7.30 Report and Stateline. It was originally hosted by Leigh Sales and Chris Uhlmann.

In 2012, Uhlmann was appointed as 7.30 political editor, therefore stepping down as host. Uhlmann remained as political editor until 2013 when he announced that he would be working on a documentary about the Rudd and Gillard governments for the ABC. Sabra Lane replaced him as political editor, until she left to host the ABC morning radio current affairs program, AM.

In 2015, Jo Puccini was appointed the Executive Producer.

In December 2016, ABC announced that Andrew Probyn would replace Sabra Lane as political editor. In August 2017, Probyn moved to a new role as ABC's political editor replacing Chris Uhlmann who left the broadcaster for the Nine Network.

In February 2018, Laura Tingle was appointed as political editor replacing Probyn.

In 2014, Sarah Ferguson hosted the show whilst Leigh Sales was on maternity leave. She received critical acclaim for her hard-hitting interview style from many Australian media outlets. Laura Tingle, Michael Rowland, Virginia Trioli and Ellen Fanning are fill-in presenters.

In February 2022, Sales announced that she would be stepping down as host after almost 12 years in the role. She would finish at the program in June, after the federal election and will stay with the ABC. Current executive producer Justin Stevens will also be leaving the role imminently to become the head of ABC's news, analysis and investigations division.

In April 2022, the ABC announced Sarah Ferguson would return from her role as special correspondent in Washington to succeed Sales as the host of 7.30 from July 2022.

State editions
On 28 November 2014 Quentin Dempster announced the final episode of the state editions would be the following week (5 December 2014), corresponding with his departure from the public broadcaster.

The state editions of 7.30 were broadcast on ABC at 7:30 p.m., with eight separate state and territory specific editions. Each local version of 7.30'' was also broadcast nationally on ABC News over the weekend.

See also

 List of longest-running Australian television series

References

External links
Official site

Australian Broadcasting Corporation original programming
2011 Australian television series debuts
ABC News and Current Affairs
Australian non-fiction television series